Message is the second album released on 2001 by the Okinawa band Mongol800.

Track listing 

 Anata ni (あなたに / To You)
 Song for You
 Chiisana Koi no Uta (小さな恋のうた / A Small Love Song)
 Melody
 Tsuki Akari no Shita de (月灯りの下で / Under the Moonlight)
 For Life
 Oyashirazu -Summer Again- (親知らず－Summer Again－/ Wisdom -Summer Again-)
 HEY Mommy
 Marriage Blue
 Mujun no Ue ni Saku Hana (矛盾の上に咲く花 / Flowers Bloom on Contradiction)
 Ryuukyuu Aika (琉球愛歌 / Okinawan Love Song)
 Dear My Lovers
 Yume Kanau (夢叶う / Dreams Come True)
 Dandelion

Charts

Chiisana Koi no Uta 
"A Small Love Song" became popular and has seen various cover applications in multimedia. It is used as an insert song of Operation Love, and also for the soundtrack of Teasing Master Takagi-san. More recently, a cover sung by Manaka Iwami acts as the ending of The Angel Next Door Spoils Me Rotten.

References

2001 albums